Doumea sanaga is a species of catfish in the genus Doumea. It lives in the upper Sanaga River in Cameroon, which it is also named after. Its length reaches 8 cm.

References 

Amphiliidae
Freshwater fish of Africa
Fish described in 2007